Dhuri Junction railway station is located in Sangrur district in the state of Punjab in India and serves Dhuri city. Dhuri Junction station falls under Ambala railway division of Northern Railway zone of Indian Railways.

The railway station 
Dhuri station is located on the single track,  broad gauge  Ludhiana–Jakhal line where it was originally built in 1905. Later another Bathinda–Rajpura line was added passing through Dhuri creating a junction station. It is well connected to a number of major cities.

Electrification 
Dhuri Junction railway station has electrified lines. Electrification of the Ludhiana to Dhuri line was completed in 2019. The electrification of 62 km long stretch of Dhuri(Punjab)–Jakhal(Haryana) on Ludhiana–Jakhal line was completed and trial runs were successfully carried out in July 2020. The 68 km long stretch from Dhuri station to Lehra Muhabbat station on Bathinda–Rajpura line was also completed in July 2020.

Amenities 
Dhuri Junction railway station has all basic amenities like drinking water with water cooler, public toilets above prescribed norms, retiring room, sheltered area with adequate seating, telephone booth and an ATM. There is one foot overbridge connecting platforms.

References

External links 

 Pictures of Dhuri Junction railwaystation

Railway stations in Sangrur district
Ambala railway division
Railway stations opened in 1905